is a town located in Tōhaku District, Tottori Prefecture, Japan. , the town had an estimated population of 16,434 in 6452 households and a population density of 120 persons per km².

Etymology
The name of Kotoura in Japanese is formed from two kanji. The first, refers to the traditional Japanese 13-string musical instrument, and the second,  means "cove". The name of the town is taken from a stretch of the coast on the Japan Sea called .

Geography
Kotoura  is located in central Tottori Prefecture, bordered by the Sea of Japan to the north  while the southern part of the city rises to the Chūgoku Mountains. Mount Senjō, to the southwest of the town, is within the Mount Daisen range.. It is designated as a heavy snowfall area.

Neighboring  municipalities 
Tottori Prefecture
Daisen to the west
Kōfu to the south
Hokuei to the east
Kurayoshi to the southeast

Climate
Kotoura is classified as a Humid subtropical climate (Köppen Cfa) characterized by warm summers and cold winters with heavy snowfall.  The average annual temperature in Kotoura is 15.2 °C. The average annual rainfall is 2097 mm with September as the wettest month. The temperatures are highest on average in August, at around 26.3 °C, and lowest in January, at around 5.1 °C.

Demography
Per Japanese census data, the population of Kotoura has been as follows. The population has been slowly declining since the 1950s

History
Kotoura has been settled since ancient times. A Yayoi period (300 BC–250 AD) dōtaku was unearthed in Yabase district, one of only 400 in Japan, and a bronze sword was unearthed in Tagoshi district, and both items suggest a prosperous settlement in Kotoura in this period. Kotoura was part of ancient Hōki Province, and the ruins of an extensive Asuka period Buddhist temple Sainoo temple ruins is a Special National Historic Site. The diary of Fujiwara no Sanesuke (957–1046), published as the Shōyūki describe rich pastures in the area during the Heian period (794–1185). Kotoura was used after this period as a center for animal husbandry. In the Edo period (1603–1868) a karō of Tottori Domain resided in Kotoura, and the town supported a thriving market in the Urayasu district.

Following the Meiji restoration, the area was organized into villages within Tōhaku District, Tottori Prefecture The town of Kotoura was formed on September 1, 2004 by the merger of the towns of Tōhaku and Akasaki.

Government
Kotoura has a mayor-council form of government with a directly elected mayor and a unicameral town council of eight members. Kotoura, collectively with the other municipalities of Tōhaku District, contributes three members to the Tottori Prefectural Assembly. In terms of national politics, the town is part of Tottori 2nd district of the lower house of the Diet of Japan.

Economy
The economy of Kotoura is based agriculture and food processing, including sake and soy sauce brewing.

Education
Kotoura has four public elementary schools and two public junior high schools operated by the town government. The town does not have high school, but the Tottori Prefectural Board of Education operates a special education school for the handicapped.

Transportation

Railway
 JR West - San'in Line
  - -

Highway
  San'in Expressway

Local attractions

Mount Senjō and Mount Senjō Sakura Festival
Daisen Waterfall
Sainoo temple ruins, Special National Historic Site
Yabase Castle ruins
Kawamoto Family Residence

Notable people
Tomoyuki Kawabata, cyclist (1985–)
Yoshihiro Kawakami, politician (1950–)
Kaori Kawanaka, archer (1991–)
Shigeru Kobayashi, baseball pitcher (1952–2010)
Teikō Shiotani, photographer (1899–1988)

References

External links

Town of Kotoura 

Towns in Tottori Prefecture
Tōhaku District, Tottori
Kotoura, Tottori
Populated coastal places in Japan